John Francis O'Hern (June 4, 1874 – May 22, 1933) was an American prelate of the Roman Catholic Church who served as bishop of the Diocese of Rochester from 1929 until his death in 1933.

Biography

Early life 
One of ten children, John O'Hern was born in Olean, New York, to Patrick and Ellen (née Casey) O'Hern. Three of his brothers also entered the priesthood, and another served in the field staff of General John J. Pershing during World War I. After graduating from Olean High School, John O'Hern attended St. Andrew's Preparatory Seminary and St. Bernard's Seminary in Rochester. 

In 1897, O'Hern was sent to Rome to study at the Pontifical North American College in Rome, later earning a Doctor of Divinity degree from the College of Propaganda.

Priesthood 
was ordained a priest in Rome for the Diocese of Rochester by Cardinal Pietro Respighi in Rome on February 17, 1901. Upon his return to Rochester, he was named curate at Immaculate Conception Parish and later at St. Patrick's Cathedral Parish, where he became pastor in 1908. O'Hern became pastor of Corpus Christi Parish in Rochester in 1921, and vicar general of the diocese in 1922.

Bishop of Rochester 
On January 4, 1929, O'Hern was appointed the third bishop of the Diocese of Rochester by Pope Pius XI. He received his episcopal consecration on March 9, 1929, from Cardinal Patrick Hayes, with Archbishop Edward Hanna and Bishop Thomas O'Reilly serving as co-consecrators. During his tenure, he worked toward establishing ecumenical ties with non-Catholics and promoting numerous associations of the laity. He supported the Community Chest and Red Cross, and provided chaplains for Catholics attending secular colleges in the diocese.

John O'Hern died in Rochester on May 22, 1933 at age 58.

References

1874 births
1933 deaths
People from Olean, New York
20th-century Roman Catholic bishops in the United States
Catholics from New York (state)